Lisa Fischer (born 27 May 1959, in Vienna) is an Austrian historian and social scientist specialising in women's history, best known for her biographies on Lina Loos, Herta Staub, Anna-Lülja Praun, and Margarete Depner.

References 

1959 births
Living people
Austrian historians